The Confederated Tribes of the Chehalis Reservation is a federally recognized tribe located in Southwest Washington. The Confederation consists of the Upper and Lower Chehalis, Klallam, Muckleshoot, Nisqually, and Quinault peoples. They are apart of the Northern Straits branch Central Coast Salish peoples of indigenous peoples of the Northwest Coast.

The Confederated Tribes' traditional territories were along the Black, Chehalis, Cowlitz, Elk, Johns, Newaukum, Satsop, Shookumchuck, and Wynoochee Rivers, and included lands from the Southwest coast to the lower Puget Sound of Washington.

Reservation

The Chehalis Reservation ranges , and is home to more than 600 American Indians. The reservation was first established in 1860 for the Lower and Upper Chehalis people. Originally  larger,  of land was distributed to non-native settlers in 1866 via Executive Order. An additional  was given to schools {{When|January 2023}}. By 1906, fewer than 150 Chehalis people remained on the reservation and a 1984 survey found the population to be 382.

Government
The Confederated Tribes of the Chehalis Reservation's headquarters is in Oakville, Washington. The Tribe is governed by a democratically elected five-member General Council. The existing constitution and bylaws were ratified on 15 July 1939.

Chairmen
As of November 2022, Dustin Klatush serves as the current Chairman of the Confederated Tribes of the Chehalis.

Past chairmen include:
 Harry Pickernell Sr. (2017-2023)
 Don Secena (2015 -2017)
 David Burnett (

Language
English has become the common spoken language of the Tribe. Traditional languages include the Upper Chehalis and Lower Chehalis languages, which are derived from the Quinault languages of the Tsamosan branch of the Salish language family. The last native speaker of the Upper Chehalis language died in 2001.

Economic development
The Chehalis Tribe owns and operates Lucky Eagle Casino, Eagle’s Landing Hotel, Grand Buffet, Scatter Creek Grill, Prime Rib and Steakhouse, Sidewalk Deli in Rochester, Washington, the Great Wolf Lodge Resort and Talking Cedar Brewing in Grand Mound, Washington. It also owns three convenience stores, a fast food restaurant, two construction companies, and a cigarette stamping business. The tribe employs 1,498 people.

Notes

References
 Pritzker, Barry M. A Native American Encyclopedia: History, Culture, and Peoples. Oxford: Oxford University Press, 2000. .

External links
 Chehalis Tribe, official website

 Confederated Tribes of the Chehalis Reservation, official website

Coast Salish governments
Klallam
Native American tribes in Washington (state)
Geography of Grays Harbor County, Washington
Geography of Thurston County, Washington
Federally recognized tribes in the United States
Indigenous peoples of the Pacific Northwest Coast